Full Spectrum is a series of five anthologies of fantasy and science fiction short stories published between 1988 and 1995 by Bantam Spectra. The first anthology was edited by Lou Aronica and Shawna McCarthy; the second by Aronica, McCarthy, Amy Stout, and Pat LoBrutto; the third and fourth by Aronica, Stout, and Betsy Mitchell; and the fifth by Jennifer Hershey, Tom Dupree, and Janna Silverstein.

Volumes
 Full Spectrum - 1988
 Contents 
 Introduction – Lou Aronica and Shawna McCarthy
 Voices of the Kill - Thomas M Disch
 This is the Year Zero - Andrew Weiner
 Proselytes - Gregory Benford
 The Fourth Moxie Branch - Jack McDevitt
 Prayerware - Jack Massa
 Mannequins - Charles Oberndorf
 Moments of Clarity - Elissa Malcohn
 A Gift of the People - Robert Sampson
 The Last Rainmaking Song - Jeffrey J. Mariotte
 Tinker to Evers to Chance - Steven Bryan Bieler
 The Farm System - Howard V. Hendrix
 Ghost Ship - Walton Simons
 Philippa's Hands - Nancy Kress
 Reflections in a Magnetic Mirror - Kevin J Anderson and Doug Beason
 Listening - Ronnie Seagren
 My Year with the Aliens - Lisa Goldstein
 Oz - Lewis Shiner
 Dead Men on TV - Pat Murphy
 Once in a Lullaby - Fred Bals
 My Imaginary Parents - T. L. Parkinson
 Bible Stories for Adults, No. 17: The Deluge - James Morrow
 Beyond the Seventh Sphere - Aaron Schutz
 Magister Rudy - Richard Grant
 The Thing Itself - Michael Blumlein
 Journals of the Plague Years - Norman Spinrad

 Full Spectrum 2 - 1989
 Contents
 'Saurus Wrecks - Edward Bryant
 Whistle - Jack McDevitt
 Attitude of the Earth Toward Other Bodies - James Sallis
 Malheur Maar - Vonda N. McIntyre
 The Boy in the Tree - Elizabeth Hand
 All Our Sins Forgotten - David Ira Cleary
 The Painted Man - Joseph Gangemi
 A Plague of Strangers - Karen Haber
 The Giving Plague - David Brin;
 Re: Generations - Mike McQuay
 Silver - Steven Spruill
 As a Still Small Voice - Marcos Donnelly
 Then I Sleeps and Dreams of Rose - Deborah Million
 A Plethora of Angels - Robert Sampson;
 Strange Attractors - Lori Ann White
 Barbara Hutton Toujours - Gay Partington Terry
 The Gamemaker - Carolyn Ives Gilman
 An Excerpt from The Confession of the Alchemist Edward Dee, Who Was Burnt in the City of Findias on the Planet Paracelsus, 1437 PIC (Post Imperial Colonial Period) - Michaela Roessner
 The Doorkeeper of Khaat - Patricia A. McKillip;
 Dogs Die - Michael Kallenberger
 Rain, Steam and Speed - Steven Popkes
 Close to Light - Charles Oberndorf
 Shiva - James Killus
 Sleepside Story - Greg Bear;
 Frankenstein Goes Home - Alan Rodgers
 The Edge of the World - Michael Swanwick
 The Part of Us that Loves - Kim Stanley Robinson

 Full Spectrum 3 - 1991
 Contents
 Introduction – Lou Aronica
 Daughter Earth – James Morrow
 Dogstar Man – Nancy Willard
 Prism Tree – Tony Daniel
 Desert Rain – Mark L. Van Name and Pat Murphy
 Precious Moments – Kristine Kathryn Rusch
 Lethe – Peg Kerr
 Lake Agassiz – Jack McDevitt
 Transfusion – Joelle Wintrebert, translated by Kim Stanley Robinson
 The Dark at the Corner of the Eye – Patricia Anthony
 Tracking the Random Variable – Marcos Donnelly
 Division By Zero – Ted Chiang
 Matter’s End – Gregory Benford
 Newton’s Sleep – Ursula K. LeGuin
 The Helping Hand – Norman Spinrad
 Fondest of Memories – Kevin J. Anderson
 Loitering at Death’s Door – Wolfgang Jeschke, translated by Sally Schiller and Anne Calveley
 Rokuro – Poul Anderson
 Police Actions – Barry N. Malzberg
 Black Glass – Karen Joy Fowler
 Chango Chingmadre, Dutchman, & Me – R. V. Branham
 Apartheid, Superstrings, and Mordecai Thubana – Michael Bishop
 Snow on Sugar Mountain – Elizabeth Hand
 When the Rose is Dead – David Zindell

Cover Art by Barclay Shaw
 Full Spectrum 4 - 1993
 Contents 
 Fragments from the Women's Writing - Ursula K. Le Guin
 Motherhood, Etc. - L. Timmel Duchamp
 The Saints - Bonita Kale
 The Best Lives of Our Years - A. R. Morlan
 Embodied In Its Opposite - John M. Landsberg
 Foreigners - Mark Rich
 The Googleplex Comes and Goes - Del Stone Jr.
 The Beauty Addict - Ray Aldridge
 In Medicis Gardens - Jean-Claude Dunyach
 The Woman Who Loved Pigs - Stephen R. Donaldson
 The Story So Far - Martha Soukup
 Suicidal Tendencies - Dave Smeds
 The Mind's Place - Gregory Feeley
 Ah! Bright Wings - Howard V. Hendrix
 Vox Domini - Bruce Holland Rogers
 The Erl-King - Elizabeth Hand
 The Death of John Patrick Yoder - Nancy Kress
 Human, Martian - One, Two, Three - Kevin J. Anderson
 What Continues, What Fails - David Brin
 Roar at the heart of the World - Danith McPherson
 About the Authors
Cover Art by SIUDMAK
 Full Spectrum 5 - 1995
Contents 
Simply Indispensable - Michael Bishop
 The Insipid Profession of Jonathan Hormebom - Jonathan Lethem
 Evita, Among the Wild Beasts - S.A.Stolnack
 The Music of What Happens - Howard V. Hendrix
 A Belly Full of Stars - Michael Gust
 Cool Zone - Pat York
 Of Silence and Slow Time - Karawynn Long
 The Breakthrough - Paul Park
 Shimabara - Karen Joy Fowler
 What Dreams Are Made On - Mark Bourne
 Which Darkness Will Come Upon Us? - John M. Landsberg
 Wonders of the Invisible World - Patricia A. McKillip
 Excerpt from the Third and Last Volume of Tribes of the Pacific Coast - Neal Stephenson
 The Sixty-third Anniversary of Hysteria - Lisa Mason
 When a Man's an Empty Kettle - William Barton
 The Dead Eye of the Camera - Jean-Claude Dunyach
 Tale of the Blue Spruce Dreaming (Or How to Be Flesh) - Jean Mark Gawron
 The Question Eaters - Tricia Sullivan
 Homecoming - Doug Beason
 The Massive Quantities of Ice - William John Watkins
 Hearts and Flowers - Lawrence Watt-Evans
 Goddoggit - Emily Devenport
 Saving Face - Andrew Lane
 Ruby - Alan Rodgers
 Where the Shadows Rise and Fall - Pat MacEwen
 Fountains in Summer - Richard Bowes
 A Fruitful Harvest - Lauren Fitzgerald
 The Ziggurat - Gene Wolfe
 About the Authors
Cover Art by Michael Parkes

Awards
Full Spectrum 4, the fourth book from the series won the 1994 World Fantasy Award for Best Anthology. 

Several works from the series have been nominated for awards as well. From the first anthology, "Bible Stories for Adults, No. 17: The Deluge" by James K. Morrow won the 1989 Nebula Award for Best Short Story, "The Fourth Moxie Branch" by Jack McDevitt was nominated for the 1989 Hugo Award for Best Short Story and the Nebula Award for Best Short Story; "Voices of the Kill" by Thomas M. Disch and "Dead Men on TV" by Pat Murphy were nominated for the Nebula Award for Best Short Story, and "Journals of the Plague Years" by Norman Spinrad was nominated for the 1989 Hugo Award for Best Novella and Nebula Award for Best Novella.

"The Edge of the World" by Michael Swanwick in Full Spectrum 2 was nominated for the 1990 World Fantasy Award for Best Short Story. "Black Glass" by Karen Joy Fowler in Full Spectrum 3 was nominated for the 1992 Nebula Award for Best Novelette and "Matter's End" by Gregory Benford was nominated for the 1993 Nebula Award for Best Novelette. "The Erl-King" by Elizabeth Hand from Full Spectrum 4 was nominated for the 1994 World Fantasy Award for Best Novella, "The Story So Far" by Martha Soukup from that anthology was nominated for the 1994 Hugo Award for Best Short Story, and "The Beauty Addict" by Ray Aldridge was nominated for the Nebula Award for Best Novella. "The Insipid Profession of Jonathan Hornebom" by Jonathan Lethem from Full Spectrum 5 was nominated for the 1995 World Fantasy Award for Best Novella.

References 

Fantasy anthology series
Science fiction anthology series
1988 anthologies
1989 anthologies
1991 anthologies
1993 anthologies
1995 anthologies
Bantam Spectra books